La familia del Barrio (figuratively "The del Barrio Family") is a Mexican adult animated sitcom television sitcom created by Teco Lebrija and Arturo Navarro and premiered on MTV Mexico on May 5, 2013.

Beginnings and popularity
La Familia del Barrio was created in 2004 by Teco Lebrija, eventually uploading its first episode on the YouTube platform in October 31, 2008. The acceptance they had on YouTube allowed them to make the first season on MTV in 2013.

From social media to television
Three or four years approximately after its release on digital platforms, the creators of La Familia del Barrio heard that MTV was looking for an idea for a program in Mexico and the creators presented a pilot called "El Gato Razurado" with which the television channel hired them.

Main characters

Gaspar: Main character and grandson of El abuelo.
Jonathan: Gaspar's son.
Abuelo (Grandpa): Gaspar's father.
Noruego: Gaspar's friend.
Olaf: Noruego's son.
Peluzin: He is their neighbor.
Reference:

Genre and theme
It is aimed at an adult audience and is characterized by satirizing Mexican society, current affairs and culture with black humor through stories and situations. Its setting is in a fictitious building called Pino, in Mexico City, where the protagonists live. They also go to different places in Mexico and around the world. Also, they mock American culture and politics.

The 2D animation portrays the del Barrio family, which lives together in an apartment. It is formed by Gaspar, Jonathan, Abuelo, Noruego and Olaf in the John F. Kennedy housing unit in the Jardín Balbuena neighborhood in Mexico City, and the show focuses on the lives of the protagonists and their neighbor Peluzín.

Production and animation
Teco Lebrija has directed all the episodes of La Familia del Barrio.

The entire series is made in Adobe Flash, but since 2004 the characters have had different designs until 2013, when the animation was redesigned. MTV gave them creative freedom and they didn't censor anything from any episode.

Episodes

Season 1: 12 episodes, year 2013
Season 2: 12 episodes, year 2015
Season 3: 12 episodes, year 2015-2016
Season 4: 32 episodes, year 2016-2017
Season 5: 26 episodes, year 2018

Streaming
In January 2015, the series began streaming on Netflix with only the first season airing. However, in 2016 the series was removed from the streaming service for unknown reasons.

As of September 2020, the series is available on Pluto TV, both live and on demand.

References 

2010s adult animated television series
Mexican television series